Kansas's 8th Senate district is one of 40 districts in the Kansas Senate. It has been represented by Democrat Cindy Holscher since 2021.

Geography
District 8 covers much of central Overland Park in the Johnson County suburbs of Kansas City.

The district is located entirely within Kansas's 3rd congressional district, and overlaps with the 8th, 16th, 22nd, 23rd, 29th, and 48th districts of the Kansas House of Representatives. At 20.4 square miles, it is tied with the 25th district for smallest Senate district in the state.

Recent election results from statewide races

Recent election results

2020

2016

2012

References

8
Johnson County, Kansas